Ab Ghamushiyeh (also Romanized as Āb Ghāmūshīyeh) is a village in Khabar Rural District, in the Central District of Baft County, Kerman Province, Iran. At the 2006 census, its population was 21, with 5 families.

References 

Populated places in Baft County